Bieberstedt Creek is a stream in the U.S. state of Oregon. It empties into Willow Lake.

Bieberstedt Creek has the name of one Carl Bieberstedt.

References

Rivers of Oregon
Rivers of Jackson County, Oregon